Lost! is a Canadian drama film, directed by Peter Rowe and released in 1986. Based on the book of the same name by Thomas Thompson, the film centres on three survivors of a shipwreck, two brothers and one of their wives, whose chances of survival are threatened by the more religious brother's conviction that they must trust in God to save them rather than making any effort of their own. The film stars Kenneth Welsh as Jim, Michael Hogan as Bob, and Helen Shaver as Linda.

The water scenes were shot on Lake Ontario, while interior sequences were filmed in the gymnasium of Franklin Horner Middle School in Etobicoke.

The film had a brief theatrical run in 1986 for Genie Award qualification, but was distributed primarily as a CBC Television film. It received two Genie Award nominations, for Best Actress (Shaver) and Best Adapted Screenplay (Rowe), at the 8th Genie Awards in 1987.

References

External links

1986 films
Canadian drama films
Films about castaways
English-language Canadian films
1980s English-language films
Films directed by Peter Rowe
1980s Canadian films